USS Zenda (SP-688) was an armed motorboat that served in the United States Navy as a patrol vessel from 1917 to 1919.

Zenda was a wooden-hulled motorboat built in 1912 at Neponset, Massachusetts, by George Lawley & Son. She was acquired by the U.S. Navy on 19 May 1917 from Mr. Francis S. Eaton for service with the section patrol during World War I. Commissioned on 25 June 1917, she served in the 1st Naval District in eastern New England waters as a district patrol craft for the duration of the war.

Decommissioned soon after the armistice, she was returned to her owner on 30 January 1919, and her name was struck from the Navy Directory that same day.

References

External links
Department of the Navy, Naval Historical Center: Online Library of Selected Images: Civilian Ships: Zenda (American Motor Boat, 1912), Served as USS Zenda (SP-688) in 1917–1919)

Patrol vessels of the United States Navy
World War I patrol vessels of the United States
Ships built in Boston
1912 ships